Biwi No.1 is a 1999 Indian Hindi-language comedy film directed by David Dhawan, being a remake of the 1995 Tamil film Sathi Leelavathi. It stars Salman Khan, Karisma Kapoor, Anil Kapoor, Sushmita Sen, Tabu and Saif Ali Khan.

Plot
Prem Mehra is married to the loving yet traditional Pooja Khanna; they have 2 children. Rupali Walia arrives at Prem's office to give a modeling interview. They fall in love and begin an extramarital affair. Pooja finds out and Prem leaves her to move in with Rupali. With the help of Prem's friend Lakhan, Pooja has a make-over, turning modern and taking on modeling assignments. She sends her mother-in-law and children to live with Prem and Rupali. They intentionally trouble Rupali and tell Prem that she keeps them hungry and wants to poison and kill them.

Ultimately, the relationship between Prem and Rupali breaks down. Prem realizes she only came to him since he gave her material things, while Pooja stuck with him via thick and thin. Rupali gets back with her former boyfriend Deepak. Lakhan befriends her, addressing her as a sister. While hugging her, his wife Lovely sees them and misunderstands. She leaves, but Lakhan chases after and they make up as she realises the truth. He says to Lovely that she is his "Biwi no. 1."

Cast 
 Salman Khan as Prem Mehra (Chetan Sashital as the Hindi Dubbed voice)
 Karisma Kapoor as Pooja Mehra
 Anil Kapoor as Dr. Lakhan Khurana
 Sushmita Sen as Rupali Walia
 Tabu as Lovely Khurana
 Saif Ali Khan as Deepak Sharma
 Himani Shivpuri as Sushila Mehra
 Master Varun as Bunty "Billu" Khurana
 Baby Karishma as Pinky Mehra
 Master Shahrukh as Rinku Mehra
 Rajeev Verma as Harish Khanna
 Kannu Gill as Meenakshi Khanna
 Amitabh Bachchan as himself

Production
Govinda was originally offered the main role but again gave it to Salman Khan due to his brotherly love for him. Rambha was signed for Tabu’s role but later opted out.
Sanjay Dutt was signed for the film, but was later replaced by Anil Kapoor.
Manisha Koirala was offered the role of Pooja, but she rejected it for unknown reasons and was subsequently replaced by Karishma Kapoor. Bobby Deol  and Suniel Shetty were offered the role of Deepak which was later did by  Saif Ali Khan.Filming took place in areas of Florida such as Miami, Fort Lauderdale, and West Palm Beach. Second part of filming took place in Delhi and Mumbai compound areas.

Reception
The movie response was good in parts of India, and was considered a super-hit, though its business was affected by the Cricket World Cup 1999. The collections were close to 50% in all centers. Biwi No.1 was the second highest-grossing film of Bollywood that year after Hum Saath-Saath Hain, which also starred Salman Khan, Karishma Kapoor, Tabu, Saif Ali Khan, Himani Shivpuri, and Rajeev Verma. It ranks 53rd in the List of Top 500 Bollywood movies after adjusting inflation its worldwide gross reaches  52.80crores.

Awards and nominations

Music

The Biwi No.1 soundtrack was largely composed by Anu Malik and lyricized by Sameer except for the exceptions noted below. The songs "Chunnari Chunnari" and "Ishq Sona Hai" became major hits after their release in 1999. The track "Aan Milo Ya Milne Se" did not feature in the movie.

References

External links

Biwi No. 1 on Gomolo.in

1999 films
Films scored by Anu Malik
Hindi remakes of Tamil films
Indian comedy-drama films
Films directed by David Dhawan
1990s Hindi-language films
Films distributed by Yash Raj Films
1999 comedy films
Hindi-language comedy films